William Joseph Marciano (born October 11, 1947) is an American theoretical physicist, specializing in elementary particle physics.

Education and career
Marciano graduated with a B.S. and an M.S. in physics at New York University. There he received in 1974 his doctorate with Alberto Sirlin as doctoral advisor. Marciano worked from 1974 to 1980 at Rockefeller University, where he started as a research associate and was then promoted to assistant professor. From 1980 to 1981 he was an associate professor at Northwestern University. At Brookhaven National Laboratory (BNL) he was in 1978 a research collaborator in 1978 and in 1981 joined the physics department and was granted tenure. At BNL he was promoted on 1986 to senior physicist and from 1987 to 1998 was the leader of the physics department's High-Energy Theory Group. He is currently at BNL a senior physicist and since 1990 has also been an adjunct professor at Yale University. He has served as an associate editor for Physical Review Letters, Physical Review D, Reviews of Modern Physics, and the Journal of High Energy Physics.

With Heinz Pagels he wrote a highly-cited review article on quantum chromodynamics, published in Physics Reports in 1978.

The research of Marciano and Sirlin was important for experiments at BNL for the precise determination of the anomalous magnetic moment of the muon and the precise calculation of the masses of the W and Z bosons involved in electroweak interactions; such calculations are important for estimating the mass of the Higgs boson. In neutrino physics, Marciano and his collaborators proposed novel neutrino experiments with very long transmission distances around 2500 km from the neutrino generation in accelerators to neutrino detectors in mines.

Marciano became in 1986 a fellow of the American Physical Society and received in 2001 an Alexander von Humboldt Award. In 2002 he received, jointly with Alberto Sirlin, the Sakurai Prize for "their pioneering work on radiative corrections, which made precision electroweak studies a powerful method of probing the Standard Model and searching for new physics."

Selected publications
  (over 1050 citations)

References

1947 births
Living people
20th-century American physicists
21st-century American physicists
New York University alumni
Rockefeller University faculty
American people of Italian descent
Theoretical physicists
Particle physicists
Brookhaven National Laboratory staff
Scientists from New York (state)
Fellows of the American Physical Society